Surfside Beach may refer to the following places in the United States:
 Surfside Beach, South Carolina
 Surfside Beach, Texas
 Surfside Beach (Surfside, Florida), a beach and adjacent neighborhood